Travis Cave (born July 14, 1991), better known by his stage name Trap Beckham, is an American trap music recording artist from Jacksonville, Florida. He is best known for his single "Birthday Chick".

Early life
Beckham began writing music when he was eight years old and began recording at age 12 with a tape recorder his mother gave him. He began using software to record music age 14 and in high school began promoting his music with a small group of promoters he created. He is influenced by Michael Jackson and Prince.

Career
Beckham began his career on the local music scene in Jacksonville. Two of his singles, "Top of the Line" and "Ohh She Thick", helped launch his career after winning numerous awards and touring the local college scene. During his early career he earned the nickname "The Golden Boy of the Hood."

Beckham released his single "Top of the Line" in 2012. The song was on his mixtape 7.14.12 and featured Young Cash. 7.14.12 was one of three mixtapes released on his birthday, July 14, and is now part of a mixtape collection with him releasing a new one on the same day each year. He has also earned Artist, Song, Mixtape, and Performer of the year from Duval Diamond Awards in each year between 2012 and 2015.

Beckham signed with Def Jam Recordings in 2016 and also released the single "Birthday Chick". The song was compared to Juvenile's "Back That Thang Up" and Jeremih's "Birthday Sex" by HotNewHipHop. "Birthday Chick" was featured on Season 1 Episode 8 of HBO's series Insecure.

In October 2017, Beckham released his debut EP with Def Jam Recordings called Life is Lit. It featured his single "Lil Booties Matter" and skits by DC Young Fly.

Discography

Mixtapes

Singles

EPs

References

External links
 Trap Beckham official website
 Trap Beckham Videos on DefJam.com
Trap Beckham Instagram

Living people
Def Jam Recordings artists
Rappers from Florida
Musicians from Jacksonville, Florida
21st-century American rappers
1991 births